The Oldham Theatre and Music Workshop is a youth theatre group based in the north west of England.

Outline

The workshop provides all-year-round drama training to young people, with classes ranging from the playful and fun 6–8-year-olds, to challenging, devising and practitioner study for those aged 16–25. Each year the workshop produces two large-scale productions — one in December, one in June — which are often staged at the historic Oldham Coliseum Theatre.

The Oldham Theatre Workshop is now managed by the Education and Cultural Services Department of Oldham, in Greater Manchester, England.

Former members
Many well-known actors began and developed their interest in the performing arts at the Theatre Workshop, with previous members including:

References and notes

External links
Friends of Oldham Theatre Workshop

Buildings and structures in Oldham
Youth theatre companies